Elephantoidea is a taxonomic group that contains the elephants as well as their closest extinct relatives. The following cladogram shows the relationships among elephantoids, based on hyoid characteristics:

References

 
Taxa named by John Edward Gray